Michael Allen, better known as Mike Allen, (born November 20, 1960 in Fredericton, New Brunswick) is a Canadian politician.  He represented the riding of Tobique—Mactaquac as a member of the Conservative Party of Canada in the House of Commons of Canada from 2006 until 2015 when he chose to retire from parliament.

Allen comes from a very politically active family.  His father, Ed Allen, was a longtime member of the Legislative Assembly of New Brunswick where he served in the cabinet of Richard Hatfield.  His brother, Dale Allen, is the head of a coalition office that opposes recent hospital closures in the Upper Saint John River Valley.

Allen first stood for office in the 2004 federal election but was defeated by incumbent Andy Savoy by a margin of 3008 votes.  Allen defeated Savoy in 2006 by 254 votes.

Post-Parliamentary Career

Run for Chairmanship of the New Brunswick Progressive-Conservatives 
In 2016, Allen ran for the leadership of the Progressive Conservative Party of New Brunswick. One of 7 candidates, he won 16.25% of the Vote in the October 22nd Convention's 1st round. In the 2nd round, he won 20.22%, coming in last place, and being eliminated as a result.

Campaign Finance Violations 
In July 2018, Allen was Charged with Campaign Finance Violations during his bid for the Chairmanship of Progressive Conservative Party of New Brunswick, under the claim that he and his wife donated a sum of over $6,000 to his campaign, hence passing the Contribution Limit. In May 2019, he pleaded guilty to violations of campaign finance law, and was made to pay $10,000 in Fines.

Electoral history

References

External links

1960 births
Conservative Party of Canada MPs
Living people
Members of the House of Commons of Canada from New Brunswick
Politicians from Fredericton
21st-century Canadian politicians